Saint Aquilinus of Milan (died 1015), also known as Aquilinus of Cologne, is venerated as a martyr by the Catholic Church.

He should not be confused with another Aquilinus, who was killed during the reign of the Arian Vandal king Hunneric in 484.  This 5th century Aquilinus was killed with Eugene, Geminus, Marcian, Quintus, Theodotus, and Tryphon. Bede writes about them.  He should also not be confused with an early bishop of Cologne named Aquilinus.

Biography
Born in Würzburg to a noble family, he studied theology in Cologne, where he became a priest.  He was offered the bishopric of Cologne, but he refused, preferring to become a wandering preacher.

He traveled to Paris, where he miraculously cured some people of the cholera.  As a result, he was offered the bishopric of Paris, but this he also refused.  He traveled to Pavia, where he preached against Cathars, Manichaeans, and Arians there.

He then traveled to Milan, where, according to local tradition, he was stabbed by a member of one of these sects, along with his companion Constantius (Costanzo).  His body was thrown into a drain, near the Porta Ticinese.  His body was found and then buried in the Basilica of San Lorenzo, Milan.  The Cappella di Sant'Aquilino is dedicated to him.

Gallery

References

External links
 Sant’Aquilino
Aquilinus of Milan
 Den hellige Aquilinus av Milano (~970-1015)

11th-century Christian saints
German Roman Catholic saints
1015 deaths
Year of birth unknown